There have been two railway stations named Maiden Lane in the present London Borough of Camden, in north London, England. The stations, named after the nearby road (now York Way), were close to each other, but on different lines.

Great Northern Railway station

This station, opened on 7 August 1850 as the "London Temporary Passenger Station", was the temporary London terminus of the Great Northern Railway. It was opened so that the railway could earn revenue from visitors travelling to visit the Great Exhibition of 1851. Covered by a double-span train shed, there were two platforms and two release roads. The main station buildings were on the down side of the station. The station served passengers until 14 October 1852, when the last section of the East Coast Main Line and King's Cross station were opened. The station subsequently served as a potato warehouse before it was demolished, some time after 1874.

North London Railway station

This Maiden Lane station -  - was a short distance northwest of the Great Northern Railway station and near the present High Speed 1 tunnel portal. It also served King's Cross Goods Yard.  It closed in 1916  or 1917, after the LNWR in 1916 electrified the southern pair of the four tracks for passenger services, leaving the northern pair, on which the station was built, solely for steam-hauled goods traffic.

Camden Council has suggested this station could be rebuilt and reopened, in conjunction with the King's Cross Central redevelopment project.

In June 2017, the Council were talking with TfL on the possible reopening of Maiden Lane and York Road stations which it wished to reopen with Maiden Lane more likely to reopen than York Road.

References

External links 
 London's Abandoned Stations - Maiden Lane
 1874 map showing site of station

Disused railway stations in the London Borough of Camden
Former North London Railway stations
Railway stations in Great Britain opened in 1887
Railway stations in Great Britain closed in 1917
Proposed London Overground stations
Former buildings and structures in the London Borough of Camden